"99 Problems" is the third single released by American rapper Jay-Z in 2004 from The Black Album. It was released on April 27, 2004. The chorus hook "I got 99 problems, but a bitch ain't one" is taken from the Ice-T single "99 Problems" from the album Home Invasion (1993). The hook was coined during a conversation  between Ice-T and Brother Marquis of Miami-based 2 Live Crew. Marquis used the phrase in the 1996 2 Live Crew song "Table Dance".

In the song, Jay-Z tells a story about dealing with rap critics, racial profiling from a police officer who wants to search his car, and an aggressor. The song reached number 30 on the Billboard Hot 100.

Production
The track was produced by Rick Rubin, his first hip hop production in many years. Rubin provided Jay-Z with a guitar riff and stripped-down beat that were once his trademarks. In creating the track Rubin used some classic 1980s sample staples such as "The Big Beat" by Billy Squier, "Long Red" by Mountain, and "Get Me Back On Time" by Wilson Pickett. Featuring the same Billy Squier drum beat sample, Dizzee Rascal released "Fix Up, Look Sharp" in August 2003 prior to The Black Albums release.

The title and chorus are derived from Ice-T's "99 Problems" from his 1993 album Home Invasion. The song featured Brother Marquis of 2 Live Crew. The original song was more profane and describes a wide range of sexual conquests. Ice-T would re-record his version of the song with the Rubin/Jay-Z guitar riff for Body Count's 2014 album Manslaughter in order to "reclaim" the hook from being mis-attributed to Jay-Z. Portions of Ice-T's original lyrics were similarly quoted in a song by fellow rapper Trick Daddy on a track also titled "99 Problems" from his 2001 album Thugs Are Us. Jay-Z begins his third verse directly quoting lines from Bun B's opening verse off the track "Touched" from the UGK album Ridin' Dirty.

Analysis

The second verse, describing Jay-Z's traffic stop, has received much more attention than the rest of the song.

The second verse was based on an actual experience of Jay-Z in the 1990s in New Jersey. He wrote that in 1994 he was pulled over by police while carrying cocaine in a secret compartment in his sunroof. He refused to let the police search the car and the police called for drug-sniffing dogs. However, the dogs never showed up and the police had to let him go. Moments after he drove away, he saw a police car with the dogs drive by. In a discussion at the Celeste Bartos Forum at the New York Public Library, Jay-Z described the second verse of the song as representing "a contest of wills" between the car's driver who is "all the way in the wrong" for carrying illegal drugs, and a racist police officer who pulls over the driver not for any infraction but for being African-American. "Both guys are used to getting their way" and thus reluctant to back down, Jay-Z notes, and the driver "knows a bit about the law because he's used to breaking it" and asserts his legal rights.

In 2011 Southwestern Law School Professor Caleb Mason wrote an article with a line-by-line analysis of the second verse of the song from a legal perspective referencing the Fourth Amendment to the United States Constitution, citing it as a useful tool for teaching law students search and seizure law involving search warrants, Terry stops, racial profiling, the exclusionary rule, and the motor vehicle exception. Mason writes that some of Jay-Z's lyrics are legally accurate and describe prudent behavior (e.g., identifying when police ask for consent to search, specifically asking if one is under arrest, and complying with the police order to stop rather than fleeing which would certainly result in a search of the car and might authorize police to use lethal force to stop a high speed chase). However, Mason also notes the song lyrics are legally incorrect in indicating that a driver can refuse an order to exit the car and that police would need a warrant to search a locked glove compartment or trunk—in fact, police would only need probable cause to search a car. In 2012, Professor Emir Crowne of the University of Windsor Faculty of Law wrote an article concluding that Jay-Z's lyrics may be legally correct under Canadian law.

While the song's meaning is widely debated, the chorus "If you're having girl problems, I feel bad for you son/I've got 99 problems but a bitch ain't one" was defined in Jay-Z's book, Decoded, as referring to something different in each verse. In verse two, it refers to a police dog.

Reception
The song garnered widespread acclaim. The song came in at No. 2 on Rolling Stones top 100 songs of the '00s. On the updated list of the 500 Greatest Songs of All Time, the song was added and came in at No. 172. In 2019, they ranked the song number four on their list of the 50 greatest Jay-Z songs. The song was listed at No. 14 on Pitchfork Media's top 500 songs of the 2000s (decade) and in October 2011, NME placed it at number 24 on its list "150 Best Tracks of the Past 15 Years".

Jack White has hailed the song, describing it as "the story of America ... in a nutshell, [it's] the story of all the struggles in America, black or white, [and of] class systems".

The song won Best Rap Solo Performance at the 47th Grammy Awards.

Covers and performances
In 2008, the song was memorably covered by Barry Chuckle of British children's comedy duo The Chuckle Brothers as part of BBC Radio 1's Scott Mills show. Mills described the cover as "superior, in essence, to the original".

On January 21, 2009, Jay-Z performed the song as part of his set at the Staff Ball, the last official event of Barack Obama's inauguration. The ball was exclusively for 4,000 staffers who had worked on Obama's campaign. Jay-Z tweaked the lyrics to suit the historic atmosphere, and the crowd sang along: "I got 99 problems but a Bush ain't one", replacing "bitch" with the name of the former President. At a rally for President Barack Obama in November 2012 Jay-Z changed the lyrics of the song to "If you having world problems I feel bad for you son / I got 99 problems but Mitt ain't one." President Obama quipped in his monologue at the White House Correspondents' Dinner on April 27, 2013: "Some things are beyond my control. For example, this whole controversy about Jay-Z going to Cuba. It's unbelievable. I've got 99 problems and now Jay-Z is one."

Eminem referenced the lyrics in his song "So Much Better" on The Marshall Mathers LP 2 album, with the lines "I got 99 problems and a bitch ain't one/ She's all 99 of 'em; I need a machine gun".

Danger Mouse famously remixed this song with samples from "Helter Skelter" by The Beatles as part of his oft-bootlegged album The Grey Album. The track was also remixed with Linkin Park for the EP Collision Course, being mixed with the Linkin Park songs "Points of Authority" and "One Step Closer". The thrash metal group Body Count combined the lyrics of Ice-T's "99 Problems" with the guitar riff from Jay-Z's "99 Problems" for the song "99 Problems BC" on the album Manslaughter. Big Sean referenced the lyrics in Drake's "All Me" with the line "I got 99 problems, getting rich ain't one". Iggy Azalea referenced the lyrics in Ariana Grande's "Problem" with the line "I got 99 problems but you won't be one". In 2009, fellow rapper and collaborator Kid Cudi, referenced the song in the opening verse of his song "Soundtrack 2 My Life" with the line "I got 99 problems and they all bitches". The singer Hugo recorded a bluegrass cover of the song in 2011. There have been several remixes of the track including versions by The Prodigy and Linkin Park. In particular, Jay-Z had been quoted as saying that The Prodigy remix is one of his favorites by keeping the main guitar riff but heavier and darker which in turn was the inspiration for The Prodigy track 'Spitfire' written by Liam Howlett and released in 2005.

Music video
The music video premiered in April 2004 and was directed by Mark Romanek. It received praises from critics such as Armond White, and was nominated for four MVPA awards in 2005, of which it won three. It also won the MTV Video Music Awards for Best Rap Video, Best Director, Best Editing and Best Cinematography, as well as gaining nominations for Video of the Year and Best Male Video. It was criticized, however, by the Humane Society of the United States for scenes in the video that glorified dog fighting.

The video accompanied The Black Album which, at the time, was to be Jay-Z's final release. Jay-Z has stated that he wanted the video to be as auto-biographical as the rest of the album. The goal for the video was to create a portrait of where Jay-Z grew up. In a conversation with the video's director, Jay-Z stated that he wanted the video to "make a pissy wall look like art". The job of directing this video was originally intended for Quentin Tarantino, however Rick Rubin suggested that Jay-Z offer the job to Mark Romanek.  Due to the research and influence of Romanek and the videos cinematographer, Joaquin Baca Asay, the video borrows visual characteristics from many New York street photographers and black and white photographs (Martin Dixon and Eugene Richards to name a few). The video is shot entirely on black-and-white film. It consists mainly of scenes filmed in close proximity to Jay-Z's childhood home, The Marcy Houses in Bedford Stuyvesant. These include:
Jay-Z and Rubin in a Lexus GS300 being stopped by the police (lyrical reenactment).
Jay-Z in the Marcy Houses housing project where he grew up.
Break dancers and a group doing a rhythm choreography.
Jay-Z performing in Transit Wheelers Motorcycle/Van Club House.
Jay-Z on the Brooklyn Bridge.
A woman putting on makeup.
Inmates of a prison in the Bronx known as Vernon C. Bain Correctional Center.
Rick Rubin walking with Vincent Gallo.
A funeral director making preparations.
A rabbi praying.
A dogfight with many spectators, and the owners of the dogs taunting them in preparation for the fight.
Members of Alpha Phi Alpha performing a complex stepping routine.
Jay-Z's lawyer, facilitating bail then reacting to news of his death.
African-American motorcycle clubs in front of Transit Wheelers MC Club House in Brooklyn, New York, performing street stunts.
Jay-Z being shot with multiple bullets by unseen assailants. This final scene was very controversial as music video networks normally remove any scenes with violent content. On MTV, every airing of the video featured an introduction by John Norris explaining why the network felt it was proper to air the video unedited. The introduction also featured Jay-Z explaining why he felt the scene was important to the video. Jay-Z also made a special introduction for BET. Jay-Z explained that the depiction of a shooting is analogous to the "death" of Jay-Z, and the "rebirth" of Shawn Carter.

Track listings
99 Problems/My 1st SongA-Side 99 Problems (Clean)
 99 Problems (Main)
 99 Problems (Instrumental)B-Side My 1st Song (Clean)
 My 1st Song (Main)
 My 1st Song (Instrumental)

99 Problems/Dirt Off Your Shoulder, Pt. 1
 99 Problems
 Dirt Off Your Shoulder

99 Problems/Dirt Off Your Shoulder, Pt. 2
 99 Problems
 Dirt Off Your Shoulder
 99 Problems (Video)
 Dirt Off Your Shoulder (Video)

99 Problems/Dirt Off Your Shoulder, VinylA-Side 99 Problems
 99 Problems (Clean)B-Side'
 Dirt Off Your Shoulder
 Dirt Off Your Shoulder (Clean)

Charts and certifications

Weekly charts

Year-end charts

Certifications

Release history

References

External links
Entry on mvdbase.com
Page on Mark Romanek's official site. Includes screenshot gallery, treatment, credits and production stills.

2004 songs
2004 singles
Jay-Z songs
Songs written by Jay-Z
Songs written by Felix Pappalardi
Songs written by Billy Squier
Song recordings produced by Rick Rubin
Rap rock songs
Def Jam Recordings singles
Roc-A-Fella Records singles
Songs against racism and xenophobia
Songs based on actual events
Grammy Award for Best Rap Solo Performance
Black-and-white music videos
Music videos directed by Mark Romanek
MTV Video Music Award for Best Direction
Songs about police officers